Ophir Road (Malay: Jalan Ophir; Chinese: 奥菲亚路) is a road in Singapore. It starts after the junction of Sungei Road and Jalan Besar and ends after the Ophir Flyover leading towards East Coast Parkway (ECP).

Ophir Road is located within the planning areas of Kallang, Downtown Core and Rochor. This road also is affected with the North-South Expressway construction.

References
Victor R Savage, Brenda S A Yeoh (2004), Toponymics - A Study of Singapore Street Names, Eastern University Press, 

Rochor
Downtown Core (Singapore)
Kallang
Roads in Singapore